Fletcher Aviation Corporation was an aircraft manufacturer founded by three brothers, Wendell, Frank, and Maurice Fletcher, in Pasadena, California in 1941.

History
The initial aim of the company was to produce a wooden basic trainer aircraft (the FBT-2) that Wendell had designed, but despite brief interest by the Army in the type to use as a target drone, nothing came of this aircraft. After relocating to Rosemead, California, later projects involved a family of related designs, including the FU-24 agricultural aircraft of which 296 were produced in New Zealand with many still operating today.

During the Korean War the company purchased Rosemead Airport from Bob and Jack Heasley. The roughly triangular property is located south of the 10 freeway, although the airport pre-dates the freeway. The property extended from Rosemead Boulevard on the west to the Rio Hondo river basin on the south and east. 

In 1953, the same year the FU-24 debuted, they also produced a prototype amphibious vehicle known as the Fletcher Flair. The vehicle was powered by a 4-cylinder Porsche 356 drivetrain, modified to make it a four-wheel drive. The company hoped to sell the vehicle to the US Army but the vehicle performed poorly in the water and the Army passed.

Purchased by AJ Industries, it changed its name to Flair Aviation in 1960, and produced aircraft fuelling equipment, including drop tanks and hose reels for inflight refuelling. Moved to El Monte, California, its name was changed back to Fletcher and then Sargent Fletcher in 1964 before abandoning aircraft manufacturing in 1966, with rights to the FU-24 going to Pacific Aerospace. Sargent Fletcher was purchased by Cobham plc in 1994.
Huschle von Hanstein, Press Officer and Racing Director at Porsche, presented Hans Hermann's 550 Spyder with a very special decoration with sponsorships that would change, until today, the history of sports sponsorship. Fletcher Aviation was a principal one.

Aircraft

References

Notes

Bibliography

External links
 aerofiles.com

Defunct aircraft manufacturers of the United States
Companies based in Los Angeles County, California
Vehicle manufacturing companies established in 1941